This is a list of Romanian football transfers for the 2017–18 winter transfer window. Only moves featuring 2017–18 Liga I and 2017–18 Liga II are listed.

Liga I

ACS Poli Timișoara

In:

Out:

Astra Giurgiu

In:

Out:

Botoșani

In:

Out:

CFR Cluj

In:

Out:

Concordia Chiajna

In:

Out:

CS U Craiova

In:

Out:

CSM Politehnica Iași

In:

Out:

Dinamo București

In:

Out:

Gaz Metan Mediaș

In:

Out:

Juventus București

In:

Out:

Sepsi Sfântu Gheorghe

In:

Out:

Steaua București

In:

Out:

Viitorul Constanța

In:

Out:

Voluntari

In:

Out:

Liga II

Academica Clinceni

In:

Out:

Afumați

In:

Out:

Argeș Pitești

In:

Out:

ASU Politehnica Timișoara

In:

Out:

Balotești

In:

Out:

Chindia Târgoviște

In:

Out:

Dacia Unirea Brăila

In:

Out:

Dunărea Călărași

In:

Out:

Foresta Suceava

In:

Out:

Hermannstadt

In:

Out:

Luceafărul Oradea

In:

Out:

Metaloglobus București

In:

Out:

Mioveni

In:

Out:

Olimpia Satu Mare (The club was dissolved)

In:

Out:

Pandurii Târgu Jiu

In:

Out:

Ripensia Timișoara

In:

Out:

Sportul Snagov

In:

Out:

Știința Miroslava

In:

Out:

Târgu Mureș (The club was dissolved)

In:

Out:

UTA Arad

In:

Out:

Transfers
Romania
2017-18